Dottie Bailey is an American politician and lobbyist serving as a member of the Missouri House of Representatives from the 110th district. Elected in November 2018, she assumed office in January 2019.

Early life and education 
Bailey was born in Belleville, Illinois. She earned a Bachelor of Science degree from Eastern Illinois University in 1997.

Career 
Bailey began her career in the banking industry. She later became involved with Heritage Action after the Ferguson unrest and has been a member of the St. Louis Tea Party Coalition Board since 2015. She was elected to the Missouri House of Representatives in November 2018 and assumed office in January 2019. She also serves as vice chair of the House Children and Families Committee.

References 

Living people
People from Belleville, Illinois
Eastern Illinois University alumni
Republican Party members of the Missouri House of Representatives
Women state legislators in Missouri
Year of birth missing (living people)